Vaceuchelus jayorum is a species of sea snail, a marine gastropod mollusk in the family Chilodontidae.

Description
The height of the shell attains 3 mm.

Distribution
This species occurs in the Indian Ocean off Réunion, living on rocky substrate near shore.

References

External links
 To World Register of Marine Species
 

jayorum
Gastropods described in 2012